Aleksander Tšutšelov (26 April 1933 – 1 January 2017) was an Estonian sailor who started with sailing at 1946. He won a silver medal for the Soviet Union in the Finn class at the 1960 Summer Olympics.

Tšutšelov died on 1 January 2017, aged 83.

References

External links 
 
 
 
 
 

1933 births
2017 deaths
Estonian male sailors (sport)
Soviet male sailors (sport)
Olympic sailors of the Soviet Union
Olympic silver medalists for the Soviet Union
Olympic medalists in sailing
Sailors at the 1960 Summer Olympics – Finn
Sailors at the 1964 Summer Olympics – Finn
Medalists at the 1960 Summer Olympics
Estonian people of Russian descent
Sportspeople from Tallinn